Reinhold Behr (born 17 October 1948) is a German fencer.

Biography
Reinhold Behr fought for the Fencing-Club Tauberbischofsheim. He won a silver medal in the team épée event at the 1976 Summer Olympics.

References

External links
 

1948 births
Living people
German male fencers
Olympic fencers of West Germany
Fencers at the 1972 Summer Olympics
Fencers at the 1976 Summer Olympics
Olympic silver medalists for West Germany
Olympic medalists in fencing
People from Tauberbischofsheim
Sportspeople from Stuttgart (region)
Medalists at the 1976 Summer Olympics
20th-century German people